Joe Pack (born April 10, 1978) is an American freestyle skier and Olympic medalist. He received a silver medal at the 2002 Winter Olympics in Salt Lake City, in aerials.

Pack is a Latter-day Saint. He was born in Eugene, Oregon. Joe was inducted into the US Ski and Snowboard Hall of Fame in 2001. Pack lives in Hawaii as the Head Golf Professional at Turtle Bay Resort. He is married to jewelry designer Vanessa Pack (née Gardiner). They got married at the historic Maidstone Club in 2008. They have one daughter Gabriella, and a German Shepherd named Oso. Joe is also an avid Red Sox fan.

References

 

Olympic silver medalists for the United States in freestyle skiing
Olympic freestyle skiers of the United States
Freestyle skiers at the 2002 Winter Olympics
Freestyle skiers at the 2006 Winter Olympics
American male freestyle skiers
1978 births
Living people
Medalists at the 2002 Winter Olympics